The 2012 IRB Junior World Rugby Trophy was the fifth annual international rugby union competition for Under 20 national teams, second-tier world championship. The winner of the competition, the United States, was promoted to the IRB Junior World Championship for the 2013 tournament.

The event was held in the USA from 18 June until 30 June by rugby's governing body, the International Rugby Board. All matches took place at the Murray Rugby Park Stadium in Salt Lake City, Utah. Attendance was strong for the tournament, with all four match days resulting in packed crowds filling Murray Rugby Park Stadium. All matches in the tournament were streamed live by Deseret News and KSL, with more than 70,000 users logging on to view the official stream. The 2012 JWRT landed several commercial sponsors, including Gatorade, Gilbert, and World Rugby Shop.

Pool stage
All times are in Mountain Daylight Time (UTC−6).

Pool A
{| class="wikitable" style="text-align: center;"
|-
!width="200"|Team
!width="20"|Pld
!width="20"|W
!width="20"|D
!width="20"|L
!width="20"|PF
!width="20"|PA
!width="25"|PD
!width="20"|BP
!width="20"|Pts
|-
|align=left| 
| 3 || 3 || 0 || 0 || 112 || 49 || +63 || 2 ||14
|-
|align=left| 
| 3 || 2 || 0 || 1 || 114 || 43 || +71 || 2 ||10
|-
|align=left| 
| 3 || 1 || 0 || 2 || 92 || 114 || −22 || 1 ||5
|-
|align=left| 
| 3 || 0 || 0 || 3 || 39 || 151 || −112 || 0 ||0
|}

Pool B
{| class="wikitable" style="text-align: center;"
|-
!width="200"|Team
!width="20"|Pld
!width="20"|W
!width="20"|D
!width="20"|L
!width="20"|PF
!width="20"|PA
!width="25"|PD
!width="20"|BP
!width="20"|Pts
|-
|align=left| 
| 3 || 3 || 0 || 0 || 113 || 100 || +13 || 3 || 15
|-
|align=left| 
| 3 || 2 || 0 || 1 || 103 || 60 || +43 || 3 || 11
|-
|align=left| 
| 3 || 1 || 0 || 2 || 118 || 114 || +4 || 3 || 7
|-
|align=left| 
| 3 || 0 || 0 || 3 || 88 || 148 || −60 || 3 || 3
|}

Knockout stage

7th place game

5th place game

Third place game

Final

Leading scorers
 Points = Madison Hughes, USA
 Tries = Hosea Saumaki, Tonga
 Conversions = Conor McCann, Canada 
 Penalties = Madison Hughes, USA
 Drop Goals = (none)
Source

References

External links

2012
2012 rugby union tournaments for national teams
2012 in American rugby union
International rugby union competitions hosted by the United States
rugby union
rugby union